The 2015 European Junior and U23 Canoe Slalom Championships took place at the Kraków-Kolna Canoe Slalom Course in Kraków, Poland from 26 to 30 August 2015 under the auspices of the European Canoe Association (ECA). It was the 17th edition of the competition for Juniors (U18) and the 13th edition for the Under 23 category.

Medal summary

Men's results

Canoe

Junior

U23

Kayak

Junior

U23

Women's results

Canoe

Junior

U23

Kayak

Junior

U23

Medals Table

References

External links
 European Canoe Association
 ECA Junior and U23 Canoe Slalom European Championships Kraków

European Junior and U23 Canoe Slalom Championships
European Junior and U23 Canoe Slalom Championships
Sport in Kraków
European Junior and U23 Canoe Slalom Championships